Frederick Nelson Jones (F N Jones) (4 May 1881 – 29 August 1962) was a New Zealand saddler, photographer, amusement park owner and inventor. He was born in Nelson, New Zealand on 4 May 1881.

Frederick Nelson Jones was most well known for his journalistic photographs and he recorded important Nelson civic events from the early 1900s to 1935.

Early life 
Frederick was born on 4 May 1881. His father, also named Frederick Nelson Jones, was a saddler. His mother's name was Emeline Sophia Jones. Once Frederick had finished school he worked for his father as a saddler. In 1904, he sold 1, 500 prints from the three glass plate negatives he took of the burning of Nelson College. After this, his photography business flourished and he was able to buy land and start a studio. Frederick was nicknamed "Pompy" and he was often seen on a three-legged ladder used to take photographs from above the crowds.

Personal life 
In 1910 Frederick married Ivy Florence Dougan. The two bore no children but opened an amusement park in Haven Road called Coney Park in 1921. This same year Frederick retired from photography to focus on his other endeavours such as his Pixie Town creations.

Death 
Frederick Nelson Jones died on 29 August 1962 at age 76. Approximately 5,000 photographic negatives are held by the Nelson Provincial Museum and a further 5,000-8,000 images are held at the Alexander Turnbull Library, Wellington. Frederick Nelson Jones is buried in the Wakapuaka Cemetery, Nelson.

References

1881 births
1962 deaths
New Zealand photographers
People from Nelson, New Zealand
20th-century New Zealand inventors
Burials at Wakapuaka Cemetery